The 2017–18 Austrian Football Bundesliga  was the 106th season of top-tier football in Austria. Red Bull Salzburg successfully defended their last years title.

Teams 
LASK, the 2016–17 First League champion, returned to the top level six years after their relegation.

Stadia and locations

Personnel and kits

League table

Results

First half of season

Second half of season

Relegation play-offs

Statistics

Top scorers

Awards

Team of the Year

Attendances

References

External links
  

Austrian Football Bundesliga seasons
Aus
1